Hejrenæs is a 1953 Danish film directed by Svend Methling and starring John Wittig, Astrid Villaume and Karin Nellemose.

Cast
 John Wittig as Godsejer Hans-Henrik Thann  
 Astrid Villaume as Vibeke Thann  
 Karin Nellemose as Tante Sofia  
 Maria Garland as Tante Hortense  
 Lisbeth Movin as Ulla Biehle  
 Ib Schønberg as Godsinspektør Sejersen  
 Johannes Meyer as Herskabstjener Blackhøj  
 Knud Rex as Skovfoged Ulf Henningsen  
 Bendt Rothe as Fabrikant Helge Knudsen  
 Carl Heger as Dyrlæge  
 Peter Poulsen as Savværksbestyreren  
 Jakob Nielsen as Skovarbejder Martin  
 Emil Hass Christensen

References

Bibliography 
 Morten Piil. Gyldendals danske filmguide. Gyldendal A/S, 2008.

External links 
 

1953 films
1950s Danish-language films
Films directed by Sven Methling
Danish romantic drama films
1953 romantic drama films
Danish black-and-white films